Depictions of San Francisco in popular culture can be found in many different media. San Francisco is frequently used with its iconic landmarks such as the Golden Gate Bridge, Alcatraz and cable cars; social change of the Asian immigration, Summer of Love and LGBT culture; and the economic California Dream of the Gold Rush and Silicon Valley.

Literature
San Francisco's diversity, eccentric characters, and geographic scenery have provided a backdrop for many works of fiction, including:

 1906 by James Dalessandro
 Altered Carbon by Richard K. Morgan
 Angels in America by Tony Kushner - in the play and the 2003 television miniseries, Heaven was described as "like San Francisco."
 Around the World in Eighty Days by Jules Verne
 Bite Me: A Love Story by Christopher Moore
 Black Wind by F Paul Wilson
 Bloodsucking Fiends: A Love Story by Christopher Moore
 Bone by Fae Ng
 Bridge trilogy by William Gibson
 The City, Not Long After by Pat Murphy
 Confessions of a Catnip Junkie by Allan Goldstein
 The Confessions of Max Tivoli by Andrew Sean Greer
 The Crying of Lot 49 by Thomas Pynchon
 The Dharma Bums by Jack Kerouac
 Do Androids Dream of Electric Sheep by Philip K. Dick
 The Golden Gate by Vikram Seth
 Holy Fire by Bruce Sterling
 The Joy Luck Club by Amy Tan
 The Kite Runner by Khaled Hosseini
 Little Brother by Cory Doctorow
 Love Aaj Kal by Imtiaz Ali
 Maltese Falcon by Dashiell Hammett
 The Man in the High Castle by Philip K. Dick
 Martin Eden by Jack London
 McTeague by Frank Norris
 Mr. Penumbra's 24-Hour Bookstore by Robin Sloan
 Nightwood by Djuna Barnes
 On the Road by Jack Kerouac
 Our Lady of Darkness (vignette) by Fritz Leiber
 Postsingular by Rudy Rucker
 SoMa by Kemble Scott
 Tales of the City (series) by Armistead Maupin
 The Spellman Files series by Lisa Lutz
 The Time of Your Life by William Saroyan (play)
 Valencia by Michelle Tea
 A Visit From the Goon Squad by Jennifer Egan
 Women's Murder Club series (e.g., 11th Hour) by James Patterson and Maxine Paetro
 You Suck: A Love Story by Christopher Moore

Non-fiction
 The Electric Kool-Aid Acid Test by Tom Wolfe
 A Heartbreaking Work of Staggering Genius by Dave Eggers
 The Mayor of Castro Street by Randy Shilts

Film
As in the case of fiction novels, San Francisco has served as a backdrop to a large number of films, some of which shows the Golden Gate Bridge. Films set in the city include:

 10.5 (2004)
 40 Days and 40 Nights (2002)
 48 Hrs. (1982)
 After the Thin Man (1936)
 All Dogs Go to Heaven 2 (1996)
 Always Be My Maybe (2019)
 Another 48 Hrs. (1990)
 Ant-Man (2015)
 Ant-Man And The Wasp (2018)
 Arachnophobia (1990)
 The Bachelor (1999)
 Barbary Coast (1935)
 Basic Instinct (1992)
 Beaches (1988)
 Beautiful Boy (2018 film) (2018)
 Bedazzled (2000)
 Bicentennial Man (1999)
 Big Eyes (2014)
 Big Hero 6 (2014)
 Big Trouble in Little China (1986)
 Birdman of Alcatraz (1962)
 The Birds (1963)
 Blue Jasmine (2013)
 The Book of Eli (2010)
 Born to Kill (1947)
 Boys and Girls (2000)
 Bullitt (1968)
 Bumblebee (2018)
 Burglar (1987)
 Cats & Dogs: The Revenge of Kitty Galore (2010)
 Cherish (2002)
 Cloud Atlas (2012)
 Contagion (2011)
 The Conversation (1974)
 Copycat (1995)
 The Core (2003)
 D.O.A. (1950)
 Dark Passage (1947)
 The Darwin Awards (2006)
 Dawn of the Planet of the Apes (2014)
 Days of Wine and Roses (1962)
 The Dead Pool (1988)
 Dirty Harry (1971)
 Dogfight (1991)
 Dopamine (2003)
 Double Harness (1933)
 Double Jeopardy (1999)
 Dragon Fight (1989)
 Dr. Dolittle (1998)
 Dr. Dolittle 2 (2001)
 EDtv (1999)
 The Empire Strikes Back (1980)
 The Enforcer (1976)
 Escape from Alcatraz (1979)
 Experiment in Terror (1962)
 Extraterrestrial (2014)
 Family Guy Presents: Stewie Griffin: The Untold Story (2005)
 The Fan (1996)
 Fearless (1993)
 Final Analysis (1992)
 The Five-Year Engagement (2012)
 Follow Me Home (1996)
 Foul Play (1978)
 Four Christmases (2008)
 Freebie and the Bean (1974)
 Funny People (2009)
 The Game (1997)
 A Gathering of Eagles (1963)
 Generation Now (2008)
 George of the Jungle (1997)
 Getting Even with Dad (1994)
 Godzilla (2014)
 Going the Distance (2010)
 Golden Gate (1994)
 Good Neighbor Sam (1964)
 The Graduate (1967)
 The Great Ziegfeld (1936)
 Greed (1924)
 Guess Who's Coming to Dinner (1967)
 Haiku Tunnel (2001)
 Hardcore (1979) -  third and final city Scott's character travels to
 Harold and Maude
 Heart and Souls (1993)
 The Heartbreak Kid (2007)
 Herbie Rides Again (1974)
 Hereafter (2010)
 High Crimes (2002)
 Homeward Bound II: Lost in San Francisco (1996)
 House of Sand and Fog (2003)
 The House on Telegraph Hill (1951)
 How Stella Got Her Groove Back (1998)
 Hulk (2003)
 I Married a Communist (1949)
 I Remember Mama (1948)
 Impact (1949)
 The Impatient Years (1944)
 Innerspace (1987)
 Inside Out (2015)
 Interview with the Vampire (1994)
 Invasion of the Body Snatchers (1978)
 The Invisible Man (2020 film) (2020)
 It Came from Beneath the Sea (1955)
 Jagged Edge (1985)
 The Joy Luck Club (1993)
 Just Like Heaven (2005)
 Kuffs (1992)
 La Mission (2009) - starring Benjamin Bratt
 The Lady from Shanghai (1948)
 The Last Black Man in San Francisco (2019)
 The Laughing Policeman (1973)
 The Lineup (1958)
 The Love Bug (1968)
 Magnum Force (1973)
 The Maltese Falcon (1931)
 The Maltese Falcon (1941)
 The Matrix Resurrections (2021)
 Maxie (1985)
 Medicine for Melancholy (2008)
 Mega Shark vs. Giant Octopus (2009)
 Megamind (2010)
 Memoirs of an Invisible Man (1992)
 Meteor Storm (2010)
 Metro  (1997)
 Milk (2008)
 Mission: Impossible – Ghost Protocol (2011)
 Monsters vs. Aliens (2009)
 More American Graffiti (1979)
 Mother (1996)
 Mrs. Doubtfire (1993)
 My Name Is Khan (2010)
 The Net (1995)
 Nine Months (1995)
 North Beach (2000)
 Old San Francisco (1926)
 The Other Sister (1999)
 Out of the Past (1947)
 Pacific Heights (1990)
 Pacific Rim (2013)
 Pal Joey (1957)
 Play It Again, Sam (1972)
 The Presidio (1988)
 The Princess Diaries (2001)
 Psych-Out (1968)
 The Pursuit of Happyness (2006)
 Quicksilver (1986)
 Race Street (1948)
 Rise of the Planet of the Apes (2011)
 The Rock (1996)
 Rollerball (2002)
 Romeo Must Die (2000)
 The Room (2003)
 San Andreas (2015)
 San Francisco (1936)
 Serendipity (2001)
 Shang-Chi and the Legend of the Ten Rings (2021)
 Sharknado: The 4th Awakens (2016)
 Shock (1946)
 Sister Act (1992)
 Sister Act 2: Back in the Habit (1993)
 The Sisters (1938)
 Skidoo (1968)
 Sneakers (1992)
 So I Married an Axe Murderer (1993)
 The Social Network (2010)
 Sonic the Hedgehog (2020)
 Star Trek (2009)
 Star Trek Into Darkness (2013)
 Star Trek IV: The Voyage Home (1986)
 Sucker Free City (2004)
 Sudden Fear (1952)
 Sudden Impact (1983)
 Superman (1978)
 Sweet November (2001)
 The Sweetest Thing (2002)
 Take the Money and Run (1969)
 Terminator Genisys (2015)
 Terminator Salvation (2009)
 Thieves' Highway (1949)
 Time After Time (1979)
 The Time of Your Life (1948)
 The Towering Inferno (1974)
 Twisted (2004)
 Una sull'altra (1969)
 Venom (2018)
 Venom: Let There Be Carnage (2021) 
 Vertigo (1958)
 A View to a Kill (1985)
 The Wedding Planner (2001)
 What's Up, Doc? (1972)
 The Woman in Red (1984)
 Woman on the Run (1950)
 Woman on Top (2000)
 War (2007)
 X-Men: The Last Stand (2006)
 You Kill Me (2007)
 Yours, Mine and Ours (1968)
 Zodiac (2007)

Documentary
 24 Hours on Craigslist (2004)
 The Bridge (2006)
 Crumb (1994)
 Fog City Mavericks (2007)
 Jonestown (2006)
 Klunkerz: A Film About Mountain Bikes (2007)
 Straight Outta Hunters Point (2003)
 Thoth (2001)
 The Times of Harvey Milk (1984)
Where Have All the Flowers Gone? (2008)
 The Wild Parrots of Telegraph Hill (2005)

Television

Although the city is a frequent backdrop for many television shows, many 80s sitcoms set in San Francisco (such as Full House) were actually shot in studios in the Los Angeles area. Since the mid-90s, many productions supposedly set in the City by the Bay are actually filmed in Canada, most notably in Vancouver, a frequent double for the cities of San Francisco and Seattle on the small screen. Canadian provinces often offer attractive tax incentives and more flexible union regulations for production companies.

Monk was shot in Vancouver before moving to Los Angeles, and only a few exterior shots involving San Francisco landmarks are actually filmed in the city. Similarly, recent short-lived series such as Presidio Med, The Evidence or Killer Instinct were actually shot in the Los Angeles or Vancouver areas. The city of San Francisco has tried to counter this trend over the past few years by reducing filming fees and streamlining the permit approval process.

San Francisco is also a vital part of the Star Trek science fiction media franchise. It hosts the headquarters and council chambers of the United Federation of Planets, as well as its military/exploration arm, Starfleet. In addition, the Presidio hosts Starfleet's primary service academy, Starfleet Academy. A major Federation shipyard named after the city, site of the construction and refit of several starships named Enterprise, resides in geosynchronous orbit of Earth.

The TV shows Trauma, Midnight Caller, The Streets of San Francisco and Nash Bridges were filmed entirely in the San Francisco Bay area. The Nash Bridges Reboot pilot started shooting in 2021, 20 years after the final episode of the original series aired.

Fiction
Television programs that highlight the city and its people include:

 Accidentally on Purpose
 The Adventures of Brisco County, Jr.
 Alcatraz
 All Dogs Go to Heaven: The Series
 ANT Farm
 Big Hero 6: The Series
 The Californians
 Charmed
 Crazy Like a Fox
 Dharma & Greg
 The Division
 The Doris Day Show
 Eli Stone
 The Evidence
 Fairly Legal
 Falcon Crest
 First Years
 Full House
 Fuller House
 Girlboss
 Girls Club
 Half & Half
 Have Gun, Will Travel
 Hell on Wheels 
 Hooperman
 Hotel
 Ironside
 Jackie Chan Adventures
 Journeyman
 Khan!
 Killer Instinct
 Kindred: The Embraced
 The Life and Times of Juniper Lee
 The Lineup (also known as San Francisco Beat)
 Looking
 Love Is a Many Splendored Thing
 Lucy, The Daughter of the Devil
 Mama
 The Man in the High Castle
 McMillan & Wife
 MDs
 Midnight Caller
 The Mighty B!
 Monk
 My Sister Sam
 Nash Bridges
 The Nine Lives of Chloe King
 The OA (part 2)
 Party of Five
 Pelswick
 Phyllis
 Poltergeist: The Legacy
 Presidio Med
 San Francisco Beat
 Sense8
 Sledge Hammer!
 Sliders
 Star Trek: Deep Space Nine
 Star Trek: Enterprise
 Star Trek: The Next Generation
 Star Trek: Voyager
 The Streets of San Francisco
 Suddenly Susan
 That's So Raven
 Too Close for Comfort
 Touching Evil
 Trapper John, M.D.
 Trauma
 Twins
 We Bare Bears
 Wolf
 Women's Murder Club
 Young & Hungry
 Zoey's Extraordinary Playlist

Reality
 30 Days
 "Straight Man in a Gay World"
 Animal Cops: San Francisco
 Bait Car
 Color Splash
 Dirty Jobs
 The Hills
 Laguna Beach: The Real Orange County
 MythBusters
 Oddities: San Francisco
 Real World: Ex-Plosion
 The Real World: San Francisco
 Top Chef: San Francisco
 What Makes it Tick on Fine Living

Miniseries, specials or individual episodes
 Angels in America
 Doctor Who
 Criminal Minds: "The Fight"
 Family Guy: "Stewie Griffin: The Untold Story"
 Psych: "Who Ya Gonna Call?"
 The Simpsons: "Bart Mangled Banner", "I'm Spelling as Fast as I Can"
 South Park: "Smug Alert!"
 Tales of the City
 Warehouse 13: "Philosopher's Stone"
 Ben 10: "Framed"
 What's New, Scooby-Doo?: "The San Franpsycho"
 Xiaolin Showdown: "The Journey of a Thousand Miles"
 Transformers: The Headmasters: "Head On!! Fortress Maximus", "The Final Showdown on Earth (Part 2)"
 The Amazing Race: "Huger than Huge", "It's Just a Million Dollars, No Pressure"
 Danger Rangers: "Fires and Liars"

Music

Video games
In the Carmen Sandiego computer games, the headquarters of the ACME Detective Agency is always located in San Francisco.

The Rush racing series is largely based in San Francisco, especially San Francisco Rush: Extreme Racing and Rush 2049.

In Sim City, there is a scenario re-creating the 1906 San Francisco earthquake.

San Francisco is the backdrop for all five Tex Murphy games by Access Software.  The eponymous detective makes the POST WWIII city his home and his cases start there even if they don't ultimately come to resolution there.  The games feature prominent S.F. landmarks such as The Golden Gate Bridge, Coit Tower, and Alcatraz.  In The Pandora Directive, there are 3 paths the story takes: Mission Street – The High Moral Path; Boulevard of Broken Dreams – The Low Moral Path; and Lombard Street – The In between (or Back and Forth) Moral Path.

Manhunter 2: San Francisco from Sierra On-Line (1989) was set in San Francisco, and included visits to such local landmarks as Fisherman's Wharf and Alcatraz Island.

San Francisco is one of the key locations in Fallout 2.

San Francisco is a level in both Tony Hawk's Pro Skater and in Tony Hawk's Pro Skater 4.

It's one of the four playable cities in Driver and the main setting of Driver: San Francisco.

The City of San Fierro in Grand Theft Auto: San Andreas is largely based on San Francisco, though significantly smaller and with slightly more of a focus on Rural areas.

San Fierro features Rockstar's interpretations of the Haight-Ashbury district ("Hashbury"), the Castro district ("Queens"), Chinatown, and the Golden Gate Bridge ("Gant Bridge"), as well as the city's prominent cable cars and hilly terrain. Several other familiar landmarks have been recreated, from the Ferry Building and the Transamerica Pyramid ("Big Pointy Building") to Lombard Street ("Windy Windy Windy Windy Windy Street"), and Scottish landmarks such as the Forth Bridge and the Forth Road Bridge. There is a district known as "Garcia", a tribute to Grateful Dead frontman and San Francisco native Jerry Garcia, and San Fierro's City Hall closely resembles San Francisco's ornate City hall.

In Destroy All Humans! 2, the first level is in Bay City, a parody of San Francisco featuring the Coit Tower, Alcatraz (called 'The Rock') and Hashbury Street, as well as the Golden Gate Park.

Resistance 2 for the PlayStation 3 based its first level on the edge of San Francisco in an underwater secret base belonging to SRPA. A memorable moment was when Nathan Hale steps outside to see the Chimeran fleet hovering over a destroyed San Francisco with the Oakland Bay Bridge in flames.

Call of Duty: Black Ops II features the "Raid" multiplayer map in California, along with the zombies map "MOB of the Dead," set in and around the Alcatraz Prison, seemingly infested by the undead.

Call of Duty: Advanced Warfare features the Golden Gate Bridge in the mission "Collapse".

Mario Kart 8 for the Wii U features a race course named Toad Harbor, which is heavily based on San Francisco.

Watch Dogs 2 is based in San Francisco and the surrounding Bay Area.

In Sonic Adventure 2, the first level is City Escape, which is based on San Francisco. This level also reappears in Sonic Generations.

San Francisco is an explorable city in American Truck Simulator.

Mostly in ruins and barely recognizable, San Francisco is partially shown in Horizon: Forbidden West.

Advertising
 Rice-a-Roni: The famous jingle touted the product as the "San Francisco treat".
 Levi Strauss & Co.: Stamps its buttons SF CA on its button-fly jeans. In 2005, they started to print "San Francisco" on the Dockers trademarked logo.
 IT'S-IT Ice Cream: Produced in San Francisco since 1928.
 Transamerica Corporation: Utilizes its prominent San Francisco building in its company logo.

See also
Alcatraz Island in popular culture
Hollywood North
Golden Gate Bridge in popular culture
List of San Francisco Bay Area writers

References

External links
 San Francisco Filming Locations in IMDb
 San Francisco Movie Locations interactive map (Nov. 2020) by ABC7News

 
popular culture
American cities in popular culture